Odu Raja Odu is a 2018 Indian Tamil-language black comedy film directed by duo Nishanth Ravindaran and Jathin Sanker Raj in their directorial debuts. Nishanth Ravindaran has also written the screenplay and handled editing. The film stars Simran and Guru Somasundaram alongside Lakshmi Priyaa Chandramouli, while Anandsami, Nassar, Charu Hassan, Power Star Srinivasan, Venkatesh Harinathan, Sona Heiden play pivotal and supportive roles in the film. The film also marks the comeback of veteran actress Simran in a cameo role and also marked the acting debut of her husband Deepak Bagga who played the antagonist role. The movie is produced and distributed by Vijay Moolan through his production company Vijay Moolan Talkies. The music is scored by debutant Tosh Nanda. The film had its theatrical release on 17 August 2018.

Plot 
Manohar (Guru Somasundaram) is a jobless struggling writer whose wife pressurises him to get a set top box for her and he goes out with his friend who is a drug peddler, Peter (Venkatesh Harinathan) to fulfill her wish for their wedding anniversary. But to their misfortune, both Manohar and Peter are threatened by gangster Veerabadhran (Deepak Bagga) and his sidekick to close a deal for them. However things go awry for them as they land in a retired gangster Kali Muthu's (Nassar) place for help, but it only lead to another mishap.

Cast 

 Guru Somasundaram as Manohar
 Lakshmi Priyaa Chandramouli as Meera
 Anandsami as Nakul
 Nassar as Kali Muthu
 Ashiqa Salvan as Mary
 Deepak Bagga as Veerabhadran
 Sona Heiden as Mythilli
 Ravindra Vijay as Chella Muthu
 Abhishek K.S. as Imran
 Melvin M. Rajan as Gajapathy
 Venkatesh Harinathan as Peter
 Joel Nigli as Sundar
 Vinu John as Gunnie
 Harini R. as Malar
 Rahul J. as Sathya
 Simran as Kala Bhairavi (cameo appearance)
 Charuhasan as Peria Thevar (cameo appearance)
 Powerstar Srinivasan (cameo appearance)

Production 
Nishanth Ravindaran who primarily worked as post production supervisor in films including Vishwaroopam joined hands with cinematographer Jathin Sanker Raj for their maiden directorial venture with the film titled as Odu Raja Odu. The film was produced by Vijay Moolan under his production company Vijay Moolan Talkies and was co-produced by Rajendran EM and Varghese Moolan. Tosh Nanda who worked as a part of sound department in few Malayalam films was roped in as the music director for the film and also made his debut as a full time music composer. The official trailer of the film was released on 5 August 2018.

The first look poster of the film was released by actor Madhavan on 23 September 2016.

Music

The official Promo Song Bum Ha Rum was released by Vijay Sethupathi on his Facebook page on 4 March 2017.

Release 
The film had its theatrical release on 17 August 2018, clashing with another black comedy film Kolamavu Kokila which stars Nayanthara in the prominent role, at the box office. The film received mixed reviews from critics.

References

External links 
 

2010s Tamil-language films
2018 directorial debut films
Hyperlink films
Indian black comedy films
Indian crime thriller films
2018 black comedy films
2018 crime thriller films